Griswold is an unincorporated place located within the Rural Municipality of Sifton in south-western Manitoba, Canada.  It is located approximately 38 kilometers (24 miles) southwest of Brandon, Manitoba.

References 

Unincorporated communities in Westman Region